The  is a branch line of the Sanyō Main Line, operated by West Japan Railway Company (JR West) and connecting Hyogo on the main line and Wadamisaki.

Operation
The  line has only two stops, and only operates during morning and evening, and mainly serves commuters to the Mitsubishi Heavy Industries and Mitsubishi Electric factories in the Wadamisaki industrial area of Kobe.

Although the line is officially part of the Sanyo Main Line, there is no regular through service between the branch and the main line, and Wadamisaki Branch trains depart from a separate platform at Hyogo. Because the line has no intermediate station and Wadamisaki Station is unmanned, all fare collection is conducted at Hyogo. The line makes just two daily roundtrips on weekends, with additional trips for events at Noevir Stadium, the home stadium of J-League football club Vissel Kobe.

Stations

Rolling stock

Current
 6-car 103 series EMUs (since 2001)
 3+3 car 207 series (often substituted if 103 series not available for service)

Former
 60 series passenger coaches (sometimes substituted by SuHa 43 series passenger coaches), hauled by DE10 locomotive (until 1990)
 KiHa 35 series (from 1990 until 2001)

History
The line was opened on 8 July 1890, and electrified in 2001.

There is also a spur to the now-defunct Hyōgo Kaigan Line (operated 1910–1984) about 1 km away from Hyōgo Station and a link to the Mitsubishi Heavy Industries shipbuilding facility at Kobe Shipyard just after Wadamisaki Station. 

Lines of West Japan Railway Company
Sanyō Main Line
Rail transport in Hyōgo Prefecture
1067 mm gauge railways in Japan